The Rivière Tourilli is a tributary of the Sainte-Anne River flowing in the unorganized territory of Lac-Croche and the municipality of Saint-Gabriel-de-Valcartier, in the La Jacques-Cartier Regional County Municipality, in the administrative region of Capitale-Nationale, at Quebec, in Canada. The upper part of this watercourse crosses the southwest part of the Laurentides Wildlife Reserve.

The lower part of the Tourilli river is mainly served by the forest road R0354 (north–south direction) for the needs of forestry and recreational tourism activities. The upper part is served by the forest road R0355 and the R300.

Forestry is the main economic activity in the sector; recreotourism activities, second.

The surface of the Tourilli River (except the rapids zones) is generally frozen from the beginning of December to the end of March, but the safe circulation on the ice is generally made from the end of December to the beginning of March. The water level of the river varies with the seasons and the precipitation; the spring flood occurs in March or April.

Geography 
The Tourilli River rises at the mouth of Tourilli Lake (altitude ) in the unorganized territory of Lac-Croche. This lake between the mountains is fed by the outlet of Lake Vermuy, Lake Josselin and small mountain streams.

Upper course of the river (segment of )

  east, then north, in particular by crossing Lake Martel, to its mouth;
  north-west, branching north, then east, in particular crossing Lac Trigone, to its mouth;
  to the east, in particular by crossing Lac des Laiches, up to at its mouth. Note: Lac des Laiches receives on the north side the discharge of a set of lakes (Inerte, Plissé, Hudon and Petit lac Hudon);
  to the east, by forming a hook towards the south to pick up the outlet (coming from the west) of Juneau Lake, before crossing Gregory Lake, to its mouth. Note: Lac Gregory receives on the north side the outlet of Lac des Doradilles, the outlet of a set of lakes including Hunau, Crochetière and Pleurotes, as well as the outlet of lakes Fruze, Chesnay, Godman, Etheleen, Petit lac Etheleen and Piedmont;

Intermediate river course (segment of )

  towards the south-east by first cutting the forest road R0300 which passes in the east–west direction on an istme with a length of  before to cross a small lake, forming a hook towards the southwest, then towards the southeast, until at the outlet (coming from the west) of lakes Écho and Forget;
  towards the south-east in a deep valley until the discharge (coming from the north) of the Gallant and Meute lakes;
  by first forming a hook towards the east, then towards the south-east in a deep valley, in particular by crossing the Deep lake over its full length, to its mouth;
  towards the south-east in a well-boxed valley until the confluence of the Chézine North River (coming from the north);
  first on  towards the south-east, then towards the south relatively in a straight line in a well-boxed valley and collecting the discharge (coming from east) of Carcajou Lake, to the outlet (coming from the west) of Toosey lake;

Lower river course (segment of )

  south in a deep valley to the outlet (coming from the east) of Lake Mitchell;
  to the south in a deep valley collecting the outlet (coming from the east) from Lac à la Vase, to the brook à la Martre, corresponding to a bend in the river;
  south-west to its mouth where the current bypasses an island.

The Tourilli river flows in a bend on the east bank of the Sainte-Anne river.

From this confluence, the current descends on  generally south and southwest following the course of the Sainte-Anne river, to the northwest bank of the Saint Lawrence river.

Toponymy 
In a mountainous landscape, the profile of the river and its valley sometimes appears in cascades, sometimes in almost vertical walls. This wooded area was long renowned for the richness of its forest species and game, as evidenced by the surveyor John Neilson in 1888.

This toponymic designation, of Aboriginal origin, appears for the first time in a text by the surveyor John Adams in 1829, in the form "Atourile". Two translations are known for this word: "the executioner" and "agitated water"; this latter meaning, linked to the language wendate, seems to have been imposed. The region having been frequented by several Aboriginal nations in the last century, it often happened that several names or meanings were used for the same entity. In addition, on a survey plan dating back to 1854, the Tourille river shape can be noted.

The toponym "Rivière Tourilli" was formalized on December 5, 1968, at the Bank of Place Names of the Commission de toponymie du Québec.

See also 

 Laurentides Wildlife Reserve
 La Jacques-Cartier Regional County Municipality
 Lac-Croche, an unorganized territory
 Saint-Gabriel-de-Valcartier, a municipality
 Sainte-Anne River (Mauricie)
 Tourilli Lake
 Gregory Lake
 List of rivers of Quebec

References

Bibliography

External links 
 

Rivers of Capitale-Nationale
La Jacques-Cartier Regional County Municipality
Laurentides Wildlife Reserve